Khoshnaw is the name of a Kurdish tribe mainly located north of Erbil city in Kurdistan Region in Iraq. The tribe has about 15,000 members.

References 

Kurdish tribes